Monica Sarai Arango (born 5 June 1992) is a Colombian synchronized swimmer. She competed in the women's duet at the 2020 Summer Olympics.

References

1992 births
Living people
Colombian synchronized swimmers
Synchronized swimmers at the 2020 Summer Olympics
Olympic synchronized swimmers of Colombia
21st-century Colombian women